The Wik languages are a subdivision of the Paman languages consisting of sixteen languages, all spoken on the Cape York Peninsula of Queensland, Australia. This grouping was first proposed by R. M. W. Dixon.

Each of the Kugu-Muminh dialects may have the prefix Wik- instead of Kugu-. Wik Paach is not a Wik language despite its name.

The languages are as follows; often various dialects are considered separate languages:
 Wik-Ngathan (incl. Wik-Ngatharr dialect)
 Wik-Me'nh
 Wik-Mungkan
 Wik-Ompoma (Ambama) †
 Kugu Nganhcara (incl. Gugu Uwanh dialect) †
 Ayabadhu †
 Pakanha †

The Flinders Island language and Barrow Point language were apparently Wik.

See also 
 Wik peoples
 Wik Peoples v Queensland

References 

 
North Cape York Paman languages